Sandro Sirigu (born 7 October 1988) is an Italian-German professional footballer who plays as a right-back, most recently for Sonnenhof Großaspach in the Regionalliga Südwest.

Career
On 1 December 2019, Sirigu joined 3. Liga club Chemnitzer FC on a free transfer.

In July 2020, he signed for Sonnenhof Großaspach on a two-year contract.

References

External links

Living people
1988 births
Sportspeople from Ulm
German people of Italian descent
German footballers
Footballers from Baden-Württemberg
Association football fullbacks
SSV Ulm 1846 players
SC Freiburg players
1. FC Heidenheim players
SV Darmstadt 98 players
Chemnitzer FC players
SG Sonnenhof Großaspach players
Bundesliga players
2. Bundesliga players
3. Liga players
Regionalliga players